Kassius Robertson (born April 20, 1994) is a Canadian basketball player for Monbus Obradoiro of the Liga ACB. He competed in college basketball for Missouri and Canisius.

Early life
Robertson is the son of Shannon Robertson and grew up in Toronto. He played baseball and soccer growing up but decided to focus on basketball in eighth grade. He attended Vaughan Secondary School, where he was a bench player on a team led by Andrew Wiggins. Robertson followed his AAU coach Shane James to Thornlea Secondary School to try to get more playing time. As a senior, he posted 22 points, five assists and two steals per game. Even so, he was lightly recruited, and only received his lone Division I offer from Canisius after assistant coach Mike Mennenga came to scout a different player. Other college coaches liked his shooting but thought he was skinny and frail.

College career
Robertson redshirted his freshman season at Canisius, hitting the weight room and staying in the gym late. Campus police sometimes told Robertson to leave the gym. In his redshirt freshman year, Robertson scored 6.8 points per game and was named to the MAAC All-Rookie Team. Throughout his Canisius career, he developed into a productive 3-point shooter and potent scorer. He averaged 14.1 points per game as a sophomore in 2015-16. He scored 16 points in a 93-69 loss to Kentucky on November 13, 2016. As a redshirt junior, Robertson averaged 16.1 points, 3.1 rebounds and 2.4 assists per game. He was named to the Second Team All-MAAC. After his junior season, he opted to transfer to Missouri, choosing the Tigers over Georgia Tech because he liked Cuonzo Martin’s coaching philosophy.

Robertson expected to be a three-point specialist playing alongside Michael Porter Jr., however his role expanded when Porter was injured in the first game. Robertson scored 23 points in a win against Wagner on November 13, 2017, shooting 5 for 8 on three-pointers. In a victory over St. John's on November 24, he posted 17 points and five assists. He organized late night team meetings after the team dropped three straight SEC games. Missouri rebounded to record a five game winning streak, during which time Robertson scored 20.6 points per game. Over this stretch he won two SEC Player of the Week awards. As a graduate transfer at Missouri, Robertson led the Tigers in scoring with 16.6 points per game while shooting 43 percent from behind the arc. At the conclusion of the regular season he was named to the First Team All-SEC. Robertson competed in a 3-on-3 tournament after the season alongside other SEC players.

Professional career
In June 2018 Robertson signed with Medi Bayreuth of the Basketball Bundesliga league. He averaged 12.3 points per game in the Bundesliga.

In 2019, Robertson signed with the Niagara River Lions of the Canadian Elite Basketball League, where he played for seven games before being invited to play for the Charlotte Hornets in the 2019 NBA Summer League.

In July 2019, Robertson signed with Fortitudo Bologna of the Lega Basket Serie A. He was called in the Canadian national team for the first window of the FIBA AmeriCup qualifiers where he procured himself an injury that compromised the rest of the season. On March 3, 2020, Robertson was released by the team.

On July 17, 2020, Robertson signed with Monbus Obradoiro of the Liga ACB.

On February 24, 2021, Robertson re-signed with the Niagara River Lions.

On August 15, 2022, he has signed with Reggio Emilia of the Italian Lega Basket Serie A (LBA).

On November 27, 2022, he signed with Monbus Obradoiro of the Liga ACB.

References

External links
Missouri Tigers bio

1994 births
Living people
Basketball players from Toronto
Canadian expatriate basketball people in Germany
Canadian expatriate basketball people in Italy
Canadian expatriate basketball people in Spain
Canadian expatriate basketball people in the United States
Canadian men's basketball players
Canisius Golden Griffins men's basketball players
Fortitudo Pallacanestro Bologna players
Lega Basket Serie A players
Liga ACB players
Medi Bayreuth players
Missouri Tigers men's basketball players
Obradoiro CAB players
Pallacanestro Reggiana players
Shooting guards